Pierre-Édouard Bellemare (born 6 March 1985) is a French professional ice hockey center for the Tampa Bay Lightning of the National Hockey League (NHL). He has also played for the Philadelphia Flyers, Vegas Golden Knights and Colorado Avalanche.

Playing career

Europe
Bellemare made France's top professional league, the Ligue Magnus in 2002 as a 17-year-old, playing with Dragons de Rouen. Showing early offensive promise, Bellemare was among Rouen's top scorers in each of his three full seasons with the club. Bellemare played in the Magnus until he was 20, before accepting an offer to play for Leksands IF, in Sweden's second tier league, HockeyAllsvenskan, in order to continue his development in stronger competition.

Bellemare established himself in the Allsvenskan, learning to play a responsible two-way game while improving his points totals in each of his three seasons with Leksands. In the 2008–09 season, Bellemare led the league with 31 goals however was unable to help Leksands gain promotion to the top tiered SHL (SEL).

On 21 April 2009, Bellemare left the Allsvenskan, agreeing to a contract with Skellefteå AIK of the SEL for the 2009–10 season. Establishing a role as a two-way center with Skellefteå, Bellemare produced 9 goals and 14 points in 49 games in his rookie season. As Skellefteå AIK's third-line center in the 2010–11 season, Bellemare agreed to a two-year contract extension on 22 December 2010.

From 2011 to 2014, Bellemare served as an alternate captain with Skellefteå, where he won the Swedish Championship back-to-back in 2013 and 2014.

Philadelphia Flyers
Having recorded 125 points in 238 career regular season games, Bellemare left the SHL after 5 seasons. Opting to pursue a career in the NHL, Bellemare signed his first North American contract as a 29-year old free agent with the Philadelphia Flyers, agreeing to a one-year, two-way contract on 11 June 2014.

After attending the Flyers' 2014 training camp, Bellemare made the opening night roster to begin the 2014–15 season. He made his NHL debut in a fourth-line center role, against the Boston Bruins on 8 October 2014. He scored his first NHL goal on 22 October, in a victory against the Pittsburgh Penguins. Later in his rookie season (although not technically a rookie due to his age), Bellemare's experience and dependable defensive play was rewarded when he signed a two-year contract extension with the club on 2 March 2015. He appeared in 81 regular season games with the Flyers, missing just one game, posting 6 goals and 12 points.

Reprising his fourth-line center role in his second season with the Flyers in 2015–16, Bellemare established a new career-best with 7 goals and 14 points in 74 games. He made his playoff debut with the Flyers in the opening game of the first-round against the Washington Capitals on 14 April 2016. Bellemare was suspended for one game on 19 April 2016, for an illegal check to Dmitry Orlov during game 3. He returned in Game 5, recording his first playoff point, an assist, as the Flyers shutout the Capitals 2-0 on 22 April 2016. He ended with 1 point through 5 games as the Flyers were defeated 4 games to 2 by the Capitals.

In the 2016–17 season, Bellemare appeared in every regular season game for the Flyers. He was named an alternate captain on 2 March 2017, a day after signing an additional two-year contract extension with the Flyers. He finished his third NHL season posting 4 goals and 8 points, unable to help the Flyers return to the playoffs.

Vegas Golden Knights
On 21 June 2017, having been unprotected by the Flyers at the 2017 NHL Expansion Draft, Bellemare was selected by the Vegas Golden Knights. He made his Golden Knights debut in the club's first regular season game, in a 2-1 victory over the Dallas Stars on 7 October 2017. In the 2017–18 season, he registered his first point with the Golden Knights during their home opener, registering an assist in a 5–2 victory over the Arizona Coyotes at T-Mobile Arena on 10 October 2017. Continuing his role as the club's primary fourth-line center he was later placed on injured reserve on 19 February 2018 after being injured in a game against the Montreal Canadiens. He returned on 6 March for a game against the Columbus Blue Jackets. He led all Knights forwards with 63 blocked shots and finished with a career-high 10 assists and 16 points in 72 contests. He helped Vegas reach the 2018 Stanley Cup Finals in their inaugural season, posting 3 assists in 20 playoff contests before losing to the Washington Capitals in 5 games.

In the following 2018–19 season, Bellemare was named as an alternate captain with the Golden Knights, and tallied 6 goals and 15 points in 76 games. He led the Golden Knights forwards in shorthanded time-on-ice and appeared 6 post-season games, missing the deciding Game 7 defeat to the San Jose Sharks due to injury. He was initially injured in Game 1 after he was the recipient of a cross-check to the face by Sharks forward Evander Kane. Kane was given a major penalty for cross-checking and a game misconduct, and was suspended one game.

Colorado Avalanche
Bellemare left the Golden Knights after their two first seasons, signing as a free agent a two-year, $3.6 million deal with the Colorado Avalanche on 1 July 2019. Acquired to assume the role as the Avalanche's fourth-line center, Bellemare made his debut with the Avalanche in the opening game of the  season against the Calgary Flames on 3 October 2019. Bellemare contributed early offensively, notching a career best 3 points against former club the Golden Knights in his first return to T-Mobile Arena in a 6-1 victory on 25 October, while also recorded a career high 7 points through the month of October. Even with the season ending early because of COVID-19, Bellemare set an NHL career high in goals with 9 and points with 22 during the 2019–20 season. He scored his first playoff goal in the Avs 6–4 win over the Dallas Stars in Game 3 of the Conference Semi-finals. Unable to help propel the Avalanche past the Stars in Game 7, Bellemare finished with 2 goals and 3 points through 15 post-season games.

Returning for the second year of his contract with the Avalanche in the pandemic delayed  season, Bellemare resumed his role on the fourth-line and was relied upon for his faceoff prowess in winning 60% of his draws. He appeared in his 500th NHL game on 1 May 2021, against the San Jose Sharks, becoming just the second French trained player behind Antoine Roussel to achieve the feat. Matching his previous season high of 9 goals, Bellemare featured in 53 of the 56 regular season games for the Presidents' Trophy winning Avalanche. He registered 3 assists through 10 playoff contests with the Avalanche, unable to help the team advance past the second-round in a series defeat to the Vegas Golden Knights.

Tampa Bay Lightning
Bellemare signed a two-year, $2 million contract with the Tampa Bay Lightning on July 28, 2021.

International play

Bellemare participated at the 2010 IIHF World Championship as a member of the French national team. He was also named to the French roster for competition at the 2014 IIHF World Championship. In the nation's opening group game on 9 May 2014, Bellemare scored the game-winning shootout goal to give France a 3–2 victory over Canada, France's second-ever victory over the Canadians in 83 years.

In the 2016 World Cup of Hockey, Bellemare played for Team Europe, being the only player to represent France in the tournament. Team Europe finished runner-up, having lost to Canada 3-1 and 2-1 in the championship match.

In the 2017 IIHF World Championship, Bellemare was set to receive the Player of the Game award, scoring a goal and an assist in France's 5–1 win over Finland. In an act of selflessness and respect, he waived acceptance of the award, urging it deserved to go to the French Team goalie, Florian Hardy, who had 42 saves.

Personal life
Bellemare was born in a suburb of Paris, the third of five children. His father was born in Martinique, an island in the Caribbean. He learned to skate and play hockey at age 6 when his 13-year-old sister, Aurore-Annick, wanted to play hockey and he and his brother tagged along. Another sister, Rose-Eliandre Bellemare, is an artistic gymnast who participated in the 2008 Summer Olympics in Beijing. Bellemare was in his first year chiropractor school when he accepted an offer to play in Sweden at age 20. He is fluent in Swedish, French and English.

Bellemare and his wife Hannah had their first child, Leandre, in January 2018. They reside in Sweden in the off-season.

Career statistics

Regular season and playoffs

International

Awards and honours

References

External links

 

1985 births
Living people
Black ice hockey players
Colorado Avalanche players
Dragons de Rouen players
French ice hockey left wingers
French people of Martiniquais descent
Leksands IF players
People from Le Blanc-Mesnil
Philadelphia Flyers players
Skellefteå AIK players
Undrafted National Hockey League players
Tampa Bay Lightning players
Vegas Golden Knights players
Sportspeople from Seine-Saint-Denis